Gizmodrome is the self-titled debut album by supergroup Gizmodrome, released in September 2017. It features Stewart Copeland (the Police, Curved Air), Vittorio Cosma (PFM, Elio e le Storie Tese), Mark King (Level 42), and Adrian Belew (Frank Zappa, David Bowie, King Crimson).

One song, "Amaka Pipa", was previewed on earMUSIC's official channel on 12 June 2017, three months before the release of the album. A videoclip of another song, "Man in the Mountain", featuring the band recording in the studio, was also uploaded to the same channel three days before the release of the album.

Songs 

"Stay Ready" and "Strange Things Happen", in much different arrangements, were originally released on Stewart Copeland's alter ego Klark Kent's "Kollected Works", with the latter also appearing on the soundtrack of The Texas Chain Massacre 2. "Zombies in the Mall" derives from a tune Copeland wrote for the soundtrack of Spyro the Dragon called "Louis". A song called "Stark Naked" was performed by Curved Air in 1975, during the time Copeland was part of the band, and released in 1995 on Live at the BBC but it bears little to no resemblance to the tune of the same name included in this album. Elio, the frontman of the Italian band Elio e le Storie Tese, in which Cosma is currently a touring member, guest stars as a lead vocalist and lyricist on "Zubatta Cheve".

Track listing
All music and lyrics written by Stewart Copeland except where noted.

Personnel 
Gizmodrome
 Vittorio Cosma – keyboards, backing vocals
 Adrian Belew – guitar, backing vocals
 Mark King – bass, backing vocals
 Stewart Copeland – drums, percussion, lead and backing vocals

Guest appearance
 Elio – vocals on "Zubatta Cheve"

References 

Gizmodrome albums
Adrian Belew albums
Stewart Copeland albums
2017 debut albums
Edel AG albums